Mystus bocourti is a species of catfish endemic to Cambodia, Laos, Thailand and Vietnam, known only from Chao Phraya River and Mekong River. It was formerly listed as Heterobagrus bocourti until the genus Heterobagrus became Mystus. It is demersal and potamodromus and occurs in medium to large rivers. The fish considered rare and declining throughout its range and is threatened by pollution, present and future dams and water extraction for agriculture and human settlements. Considering this and no present conservation measures, the fish is listed as Vulnerable.

References

Jenkins, A., Kullander, F.F. & Tan, H.H. 2009. Mystus bocourti. The IUCN Red List of Threatened Species. Version 2015.1. <www.iucnredlist.org>. Downloaded on 9 June 2015.

External links

Bagridae
Fish described in 1864